The Beautiful Experience is an EP by American musician Prince (his stage name at that time being an unpronounceable symbol, see cover art), his second commercial release under the symbolic moniker. The EP contained seven mixes of the song "The Most Beautiful Girl in the World" in various formats, some with completely new vocals and/or instrumentation.  Of particular note is the "Mustang Mix", in which Prince uses his normal singing voice and additional lyrics to give the song a sexual edge. The maxi-single also spawned two singles, "Staxowax" and "Mustang Mix", which were sold commercially in shops to support it.

Tracks
The EP contains six mixes, plus the original single version. "Beautiful" is a thumping dance mix of the song, with entirely new vocals (but same lyrics) recorded. All the songs are almost like a dance mix, in that they are sequenced to sound like one long suite of songs, but can be played separately without confusion. "Staxowax" is more mid-tempo in bpm, with a lot of background layering of vocals. Mayte singing a Prince referencing line from the Salt-N-Pepa song "Shoop", "Like he said, you're a sexy mutha..." (not wanting to call him "Prince"), can be heard throughout this version. The vocals on this track are also rerecorded. "Mustang Mix" is a slower version that has more of an R&B approach to it. The vocals have been rerecorded for this one too, as have the background vocals. There are additional vocals recorded as well, and a spoken section near the end. "Flutestramental" has the same beats as "Mustang Mix" and is more instrumental in nature. The "Shoop" sample can be heard in this mix. Eric Leeds plays flute on this throughout, almost as an adlib, not following the original melody at all. "Sexy Staxophone and Guitar" starts out with a cappella vocals and continues on with a tempo similar to "Mustang Mix".  "Mustang Instrumental" has the same basic background as "Mustang Mix", yet starts out with another entirely different a cappella intro. It has a flute sample played by a moog or keyboard throughout.  There are some vocals, but they are minimal. There is also a lengthy spoken portion by Nona Gaye.  She is "thinking out loud" about what to wear. She has a date later and wants to wear something that will drive her man crazy the moment he lays eyes on her. The EP ends with the original single version of the song.

An alternative cover exists, showing a fold out of Prince's symbol (the same pic as the jacket).  When it's folded out, it takes the shape of a butterfly with a woman as the torso.

There are other versions of the song that were released, including "Brian's Mix", which has then-NPG Hornz member Brian Gallagher on saxophone throughout. On the "Get Wild" single, there is another saxophone instrumental featuring Eric Leeds on sax ("Beautiful Girl") that runs 4:40, and is a saxophone solo over the original track. There were also two bonus tracks on the Japanese release, "Beautiful Extended Club Version" and "Sax Mix" (which is the same as "Brian's Mix").

Track listing

Promo

Singles and Hot 100 chart placings
 "Staxowax"
 "Staxowax" – 4:59
 "Sexy Staxophone and Guitar" – 3:36

 "Mustang Mix"
 "Mustang Mix" – 6:19
 "Mustang Instrumental" – 3:23

Chart performance
It charted on the UK Singles Chart at #18 (in the United Kingdom it charted on the singles chart, as it was seen as a 'remix single' rather than an EP or mini-album, with the chart company noting it as a release under 40 minutes with a number of mixes of a featured track), and #92 on the US Billboard 200.

Charts

References

1994 EPs
Prince (musician) EPs
Albums produced by Prince (musician)
NPG Records EPs